Shah Ali Banda is a part in Hyderabad, India. It forms a part of the Old City, Hyderabad area located close to Charminar. It is about 2 kilometers south of the Charminar.

The Shah Ali Banda Clock Tower is located here.

Transport
Shah Ali Banda is well connected by buses run by TSRTC due to its proximity to Charminar. The closest MMTS train stations are located at Uppuguda and Yakatpura.

Communal unrest
Shah Ali Banda is part of the area surrounding the Old City, which has problems with communal riots, forcing police to impose curfews. In 1992, one community cut off power to Shah ali banda in order to disable and ransack the area. Due to this violent memory, and the constant fear of a repeat attack, power cuts are handled as very extreme situations with police enforcing complete shut down of the city.

Restaurants

Shah Ali Banda is famous for its restaurants, offering Hyderabadi cuisine, such as Pista House and Shah Ghouse Café.

References

Neighbourhoods in Hyderabad, India